Mohammadabad (also Romanized as Moḩammadābād) is a village in Khosrow Shirin Rural District, in the Central District of Abadeh County, Fars Province, Iran. At the 2006 census, its population was 849, in 177 families.

References 

Populated places in Abadeh County